The  took place at the New National Theater in Tokyo on December 30, 2013. The ceremony was televised in Japan on TBS.

Presenters 
 Shin'ichirō Azumi (TBS commentator)
 Aya Ueto
 Akiyo Yoshida (TBS commentator)
 Erina Masuda (TBS commentator)

 Radio
 Kengo Komada (TBS commentator)

Winners and winning works

Grand Prix 
  — Exile

Best Singer Award

Best New Artist Award

Best Album Award 
 Land — Yuzu

New Artist Award 
The artists who are awarded the New Artist Award are nominated for the Best New Artist Award.
 
 
 
 Juice=Juice

References

External links 
 Japan Record Awards - TBS

2013
Japan Record Awards
Japan Record Awards
Japan Record Awards
Japan Record Awards